Mervyn Keane (pronounced: "cane") (born 29 July 1953), commonly known as Merv Keane, is a former Australian rules football player and coach who played in the VFL between 1972 and 1984 for the Richmond Football Club.

Predominantly a back pocket or half-back flanker, Keane later showed his versatility by frequently playing as a ruck-rover. He was generally regarded as one of the most underrated players in the VFL, and did not poll a Brownlow Medal vote in his first ten seasons. Although Keane was in Richmond’s country zone, he mistakenly trained with Melbourne before joining the Tigers.

Despite some trouble settling in, Keane became a vital member of the Tigers’ 1973 premiership side and his solid defensive work was vital for the club as it declined in the period following the resignation of Tom Hafey at the end of the 1976 season. In 1980, Keane moved from defence to fill an on-ball position made vacant by Kevin Bartlett’s permanent move to the forward line and his drive from this position was a valuable part of perhaps the most potent attacking team in League history with over 3,000 points scored. In the Grand Final Keane had 27 possessions and kicked two fine goals, but his 1981 season was wiped out by a serious knee injury requiring a reconstruction.

Nonetheless, back in defence, Keane was effective as ever in 1982, and he was still playing very well when he was approached by SANFL club Sturt as a playing coach to replace John Halbert. Keane coached the Double Blues for four consecutive seasons (retiring as a player after 1985) before the committee controversially sacked him after a season in which he had taken the club from ninth to fifth, feeling he had not done enough to sustain the traditions the club had developed under Jack Oatey. Most historians argue that Sturt did not recover from Keane’s sacking until under Phil Carman following an 0-22 season in 1995.

Keane then served as an assistant to his old teammate Kevin Sheedy at Essendon for a few of years during the early 1990s, before taking the reins at TAC Cup side the Western Jets. At the Jets, Keane played a key role in the development of such players as Brad Johnson before being appointed to coach a Williamstown club that had finished with a winless record in the same season Sturt did in the SANFL. Keane rebuilt the club, if not to the same extent his former employers were by Carman, and coached Caulfield Grammarians Football Club in 2003 and 2004 before returning to assist Sheedy in his last days at Essendon.

References

 Hogan P: The Tigers Of Old, Richmond FC, Melbourne 1996
 
 Richmond Football Club - Hall of Fame

External links
 

1953 births
Living people
Richmond Football Club players
Richmond Football Club Premiership players
Sturt Football Club players
Sturt Football Club coaches
Williamstown Football Club coaches
Australian rules footballers from Victoria (Australia)
Three-time VFL/AFL Premiership players